Kragnes is an unincorporated community in Kragnes Township, Clay County, Minnesota, United States.

Notes

Unincorporated communities in Clay County, Minnesota
Unincorporated communities in Minnesota